"It Doesn't Have to Be this Way" is a single released by British band The Blow Monkeys in early 1987. It is one of the band's best known singles, and hit the top 5 on the UK Singles Chart. The song was featured in the 1987 comedy film Police Academy 4: Citizens on Patrol.

Chart performance

Year-end charts

References

1987 singles
1987 songs
The Blow Monkeys songs
RCA Records singles